Douglas Alexander Pyzer (October 8, 1923 – October 25, 2016) was a Canadian football player who played for the Toronto Argonauts and Edmonton Eskimos. He won the Grey Cup with Toronto in 1947 and 1952.

References

1923 births
2016 deaths
Edmonton Elks players
Players of Canadian football from Ontario
Canadian football people from Toronto
Toronto Argonauts players